George Peabody Macready Jr. (August 29, 1899 – July 2, 1973) was an American stage, film, and television actor often cast in roles as polished villains.

Early life
Macready was born in Providence, Rhode Island on August 29, 1899. He graduated from the local Classical High School in 1917 and from Brown University in 1921, where he was a member of Delta Phi fraternity and won a letter as the football team manager. While in college, Macready sustained a permanent scar on his right cheek after being thrust through the windshield of a Ford Model T when the vehicle skidded on an icy road and hit a telephone pole. He was stitched up by a veterinarian, but he caught scarlet fever during the ordeal. 

Macready first worked in a bank in Providence and then briefly for a newspaper in New York City before he turned to stage acting. He claimed to have been descended from the 19th-century Shakespearean actor William Macready.

Acting career

Theatre
Macready made his Broadway debut in 1926, performing in the role of Reverend Arthur Dimmesdale in an adaptation of The Scarlet Letter. Through 1958, he appeared in fifteen plays, both drama and comedy, including The Barretts of Wimpole Street, based on the family of the English poet Elizabeth Barrett Browning.

Macready's penchant for acting was spurred in part by the director Richard Boleslawski. His Shakespearean stage credits included Benedick in Much Ado About Nothing (1927), Malcolm in Macbeth (1928), and Paris in Romeo and Juliet (1934). On film, he played Marallus in the 1953 film adaptation of Shakespeare's Julius Caesar. He also portrayed Prince Ernst in the original stage version of Victoria Regina (1936), starring Helen Hayes.

Film
Macready's first film was Commandos Strike at Dawn (1942), which starred Paul Muni. In Gilda (1946), Macready's character Ballin Mundson enters a deadly love triangle with characters played by co-stars Rita Hayworth and Glenn Ford. He again played opposite Ford several years later in the postwar adventure The Green Glove (1952).

Stanley Kubrick's antiwar film Paths of Glory (1957) provided Macready with his other great role, the sadistic and self-serving French World War I General Paul Mireau, who is brought down by Kirk Douglas's character, Colonel Dax. He had worked with Douglas previously in Detective Story (1951), and later he appeared with Douglas in two more films: Vincente Minnelli's Two Weeks in Another Town (1962) and John Frankenheimer's Seven Days in May (1964). In 1965, he was cast in a rare comedy role as General Kuhster in Blake Edwards's film The Great Race.

One of Macready's last film roles was as United States Secretary of State Cordell Hull in Tora! Tora! Tora! (1970), a depiction of the events leading up to the Japanese attack on Pearl Harbor.

Television
Macready made four guest appearances on Raymond Burr's Perry Mason, including the role of murder victim Milo Girard in the 1958 episode "The Case of the Purple Woman".  He was also cast regularly in such series as Four Star Playhouse, General Electric Theater, The Ford Television Theatre, Alfred Hitchcock Presents, Adventures in Paradise and The Islanders.

Macready performed in a variety of television series produced in the 1950s and 1960s, including many Westerns such as Bat Masterson, Bonanza, The Dakotas, Gunsmoke, Have Gun - Will Travel, The Rebel (once in the role of Confederate General Robert E. Lee), The Rifleman, Lancer, Laramie, Riverboat, The Rough Riders, Chill Wills's Frontier Circus, The Texan and Steve McQueen's Wanted: Dead or Alive. Also on TV, he was seen in episodes of The Outer Limits, The Twilight Zone, Boris Karloff's Thriller, Kentucky Jones, Get Smart with Don Adams, and The Man from U.N.C.L.E. with Robert Vaughn.

Macready was cast as Cyrus Canfield, a vengeful father searching for his runaway teenage daughter, played by Floy Dean, in the May 26, 1962, series finale of NBC's The Tall Man.

In the 1960s, Macready performed for three years in the role of Martin Peyton in ABC's Peyton Place, the first primetime soap opera on American television, with Dorothy Malone in the lead role of Constance MacKenzie.

He played publishing magnate Glenn Howard in the TV movie Fame Is the Name of the Game (1966) starring Anthony Franciosa, but was replaced by Gene Barry in the role when the film was subsequently used as the pilot for the television series The Name of the Game with Franciosa, Barry, and Robert Stack revolving in the lead.

Personal life
An art collector, Macready was a partner with colleague Vincent Price in a Beverly Hills art gallery called The Little Gallery, which they opened in 1943. (Macready had played Price's brother on Broadway in Victoria Regina.) According to Lucy Chase Williams' book The Complete Films of Vincent Price, "In the spring of 1943, during the months he was filming THE SONG OF BERNADETTE for 20th Century Fox, Vincent Price and Macready opened The Little Gallery in Beverly Hills. "We rented a hole in the wall next door to Martindale's book shop and a very popular bar, figuring correctly that we'd catch a mixed clientele of erudites and inebriates." Price and Macready saw the gallery not only as an indulgence of their own interests, but as a showcase for young artists, and a way to expose the general public to art and art appreciation. The establishment merited photos and two full columns in Newsweek magazine, but rent increases forced The Little Gallery to close after two years. Actor Robert Hutton remembers one of the slow days: "[Vincent] was a great guy. I used to go to Martindale's every morning to pick up the trades. I saw Vincent leaning up against the frame of the door and looking like, 'Why did I open up this art shop??'... I said, 'How're things going?' and he just glared at me and said, 'F**k you, Hutton!' He knew that things were not going well, I knew it, and he knew I knew! That just killed me. I was still laughing when I came out of Martindale's. He was such a good guy." When things were better, Price remembered Igor Stravinksy, Thomas Mann and Sergei Rachmaninoff browsing through the Gallery and then going to the deli for lox and bagels."

In 1931, Macready married actress Elizabeth Dana Patterson; they divorced in 1943. He was the father of activist Elizabeth Dana Macready, actor/producer Michael Macready, and Marcia Macready. He was the grandfather of gymnast John Macready.

Death
Macready died of emphysema on July 2, 1973. His body was donated to the UCLA School of Medicine.

Filmography

Partial television credits

The Living Christ Series ("Crucifixion and Resurrection" and "Triumph and Defeat", 1951) as Cornelius
General Electric Theater (3 episodes) as Clive/Henry/Colonel
Alfred Hitchcock Presents (1955–1957) as Vincent Williams/Herbert Koether/Douglas Irwin
Gunsmoke (1958) as Charlie Drain
Perry Mason (1958–1963) (4 episodes) as Roscoe Pearce/Dr. Vincent Kenyon/Charles Slade/Milo Girard 
Bonanza ("A Rose for Lotta", 1959) as Alpheus Troy
Tightrope! ("The Lady", 1959) as Latham Grant
Have Gun – Will Travel ("Ambush", 1960) as Gunder – Blind Man
The Rifleman (1958–1960) as Matt Wymerman/Judge Zephaniah Burton
The Tall Man (1960–1962) (2 episodes) as Judge Roy A. Barlow/Cyrus Canfield 
Thriller ("The Weird Tailor", 1961) as Mr. Smith
Bat Masterson (Tempest at Tioga Pass, 1961) as Clyde Richards
Route 66 (Effigy in Snow, 1961) as Mr. Fontaine
The Outer Limits ("The Invisibles", 1963, and "Production and Decay of Strange Particles", 1964) as Gov. Lawrence K Hillerman / Dr. Marshall
The Twilight Zone ("The Long Morrow", 1964) as Dr. Bixler
Peyton Place (1965–1968) as Martin Peyton
Get Smart (1968) as Mr. Fitzmaurice

References

External links

 
 
 
  with photo

1899 births
1973 deaths
20th-century American male actors
Actors from Providence, Rhode Island
American male film actors
American male stage actors
American male television actors
Brown University alumni
Classical High School alumni
Deaths from emphysema
Male actors from New York City
Male actors from Rhode Island
Male Western (genre) film actors